The 1980 Illinois State Redbirds football team represented Illinois State University as an independent during the 1980 NCAA Division I-A football season. Led by fourth-year head coach Charlie Cowdrey, the Redbirds compiled a record of 2–7. Illinois State played home games at Hancock Stadium in Normal, Illinois.

Schedule

References

Illinois State
Illinois State Redbirds football seasons
Illinois State Redbirds football